The 1998 Stuttgart Masters (known as the Eurocard Open for sponsorship reasons) was a tennis tournament played on indoor hard courts. It was the 3rd edition of the Stuttgart Masters, and was part of the ATP Super 9 of the 1998 ATP Tour. It took place at the Schleyerhalle in Stuttgart, Germany, from 26 October until 2 November 1998. Richard Krajicek won the singles title.

Finals

Singles

 Richard Krajicek defeated  Yevgeny Kafelnikov 6–4, 6–3, 6–3
It was Krajicek's 2nd title of the year and his 15th overall. It was his 1st Masters title of the year, and overall.

Doubles

 Sébastien Lareau /  Alex O'Brien defeated  Mahesh Bhupati /  Leander Paes, 4–6, 6–3, 7–5

References

External links
 ITF tournament edition details

 
Eurocard Open